Shimmy Disc is a New York City-based independent record label founded in 1987 by Mark Kramer. Before it was sold to the Knitting Factory, artists like Bongwater, Daniel Johnston, Fly Ashtray, Galaxie 500, King Missile, Boredoms, Ruins, Ween, Gwar, The Semibeings, and Uncle Wiggly recorded on the label. The label also released compilations albums such as "Rutles Highway Revisited (A Tribute To The Rutles)", 1990, which featured various artists from the label, and also introduced new artists like Paleface.

In 2020, Kramer revived the Shimmy-Disc label in partnership with Joyful Noise Recordings with their first release Songs We Sang In Our Dreams, the debut album of Kramer's project with Xan Tyler, Let It Come Down.

Shimmy Disc Video Compilation V.1

Shimmy Disc Video Compilation V.1 was the first official video release to feature Gwar, this compilation included several other bands on the Shimmy Disc label.

Track listing
Lesbians of Russia (Bongwater)
Jimmy (Bongwater)
The Box (King Missile)
Take Stuff from Work (King Missile)
Dominique (When People Were Shorter and Lived Near the Water)
This Guy's in Love (When People Were Shorter and Lived Near the Water)
Bird (B.A.L.L.)
Out of the Blue (B.A.L.L.)
Tugboat (Galaxie 500)
Hymn (Tuli Kupferberg)
Maybe (Spongehead)
Hot Dog (Michael Cudahy)
Shaft (Velvet Monkeys)
Rock Party (Velvet Monkeys)
Sex Gorilla (Dogbowl)
Daytime (Dogbowl)
What Makes Donna Twirl? (Midget Planets)
Ain't No Crime to be Stupid (Mr. Elk and Mr. Seal)
Life's a Gas (Shockabilly)
Pile Up All Architecture (Shockabilly)
Gwar Theme (Gwar)
Time For Death (Gwar)

See also
 Shimmy Disc discography
 List of record labels

References

External links
 Official site
 Video Compilation from VHS on the Internet Archive
 Trouser Press article on Kramer, the Shimmy Disc founder
 Interview with Kramer about Shimmy Disc

 
Record labels established in 1987
Defunct record labels of the United States
American independent record labels
Knitting Factory Records